The Stewart–Blanton House was a historic house on State Route 86 near Carrollton, Pickens County, Alabama.   The two-story Greek Revival-style house was built between 1840 and 1850 for Charles Stewart, an early religious and political leader in the county.  The house was five bays wide, with a two-story tetrastyle portico over the center bay.  It was added to the National Register of Historic Places on May 23, 1985.

References

National Register of Historic Places in Pickens County, Alabama
Greek Revival houses in Alabama
Houses on the National Register of Historic Places in Alabama
Houses in Pickens County, Alabama